Georgios "George" Limniatis (alternate spellings: Giorgos, Giorgios) (born March 22, 1971) is a Greek retired professional basketball player and professional basketball coach, currently serving as the head coach for Lavrio of the Greek Basket League. During his athlete days, he played at the point guard position.

Playing career

Clubs
Limniatis began his career in 1990, with the Greek club Panellinios. In 1992, he moved to the Greek club Olympiacos. With Olympiacos, he won three Greek League championships (1993, 1994, 1995), and the Greek Cup (1994). He then played with the Greek clubs Papagou, Panionios, and Dafnis.

In 2000, he joined PAOK Thessaloniki, where he played for three seasons. He returned to Panellinios for the 2003–04 season. He then played with Ionikos NF, during the 2004–05 season.

He spent the 2005–06 season with Doukas, and the 2006–07 season with Sporting. Following the 2006–07 season, he retired from playing professional basketball.

Greek junior national team
Limniatis was a member of the Greek junior national teams. He played with Greece's junior national teams at the 1992 FIBA Europe Under-20 Championship, where he won a silver medal, and at the 1993 FIBA Under-21 World Cup.

Coaching career
After he retired from playing professional basketball, Limniatis became a basketball coach. On February 22, 2023, Limniatis received his first professional head coaching position with Lavrio, replacing Christos Serelis for the rest of the season.

Awards and accomplishments

Playing career
3× Greek League Champion: (1993, 1994, 1995)
Greek Cup Winner: (1994)

References

External links
Euroleague.net Profile
FIBA Archive Profile
FIBA Europe Profile
Eurobasket.com Profile
Draftexpress.com Profile
Hellenic Federation Profile 

1971 births
Living people
AEK B.C. coaches
Dafnis B.C. players
Doukas B.C. players
Greek basketball coaches
Greek Basket League players
Greek men's basketball players
Ionikos N.F. B.C. players
Lavrio B.C. coaches
Olympiacos B.C. players
Panellinios B.C. players
Panionios B.C. players
P.A.O.K. BC coaches
P.A.O.K. BC players
Papagou B.C. players
Point guards
Sporting basketball players